Rankin House or Rankin Barn may refer to:

in the United States (by state then city)
Green-Rankin-Bembridge House, Long Beach, California, listed on the National Register of Historic Places (NRHP) in Los Angeles County
Rankin House (Columbus, Georgia), listed on the NRHP in Muscogee County
Davis-Guttenberger-Rankin House, Macon, Georgia, listed on the NRHP in Bibb County
Alexander Taylor Rankin House, listed on the NRHP in Allen County
Rebecca Rankin Round Barn, Poling, Indiana, listed on the NRHP in Jay County
John N. and Mary L. (Rankin) Irwin House, Keokuk, Iowa, listed on the NRHP in Lee County
Meade County Clerk Office-Rankin House, Brandenburg, Kentucky, listed on the NRHP in Meade County
Rankin Place, Lancaster, Kentucky, listed on the NRHP in Garrard County
Rankin House (Mandeville, Louisiana), listed on the NRHP in St. Tammany Parish
Rankin Ranch, Avalanche Gulch, Montana, listed on the NRHP in Broadwater County
John Rankin House (Brooklyn, New York), listed on the NRHP in Kings County
Holley-Rankine House, Niagara Falls, New York, listed on the NRHP in Niagara County
Rankin-Sherrill House, Mt. Ulla, North Carolina, listed on the NRHP in Rowan County
John Rankin House (Ripley, Ohio), a National Historic Landmark and listed on the NRHP in Brown County
Rankin-Harwell House, Florence, South Carolina, listed on the NRHP in Florence County
David Rankin House, Greeneville, Tennessee, listed on the NRHP in Greene County
Rankin Octagonal Barn, Silverton, West Virginia, listed on the NRHP in Jackson County

See also
Rankin Barn (disambiguation)
Rankin Building (disambiguation)
John Rankin House (disambiguation)